Chloroclystis rectaria is a moth in the family Geometridae. It was described by George Hampson in 1903. It is endemic to Sri Lanka.

References

Moths described in 1903
rectaria
Endemic fauna of Sri Lanka
Taxa named by George Hampson